This is a following list of the MTV Movie & TV Award winners and nominees for Best Show. The category debuted in 2017 when the ceremony began jointly celebrating cinema and television under the name Show of the Year.

Winners and nominees

2010s

2020s

Multiple wins and nominations
The following series have received multiple nominations:

The following networks have received multiple nominations:

References

Show